Thioescaline (TE) is a pair of lesser-known psychedelic drugs with the chemical formula C12H19NO2S.  They structural analogs of escaline in which an oxygen atom has been replaced with a sulfur atom. They were first synthesized by Alexander Shulgin and reported in his book PiHKAL.  Very little is known about their dangers or toxicity.

See also 
 Thiomescaline
 TME (psychedelics)
 Thiotrisescaline

References 

Psychedelic phenethylamines
Thioethers
Methoxy compounds